Momo the Monster, also known as the Missouri Monster (Momo), is a purported ape-like creature, similar to descriptions of Bigfoot, that was allegedly sighted by numerous people in rural Louisiana, Missouri in 1971 and 1972. Unlike some other areas with similar reports of cryptids such as the Fouke Monster in Fouke, Arkansas or the Moth Man in Point Pleasant, West Virginia, Momo did not become a major tourist or economic folklore attraction.

Description

History
The most well known alleged sighting occurred on July 11, 1972, when two young boys were playing in the backyard on the rural outskirts of Louisiana, Missouri. Their older sister, Doris, was in the kitchen when she heard her brother's screaming. When she looked out of the window, she observed a massive, dark haired, man-like creature holding what appeared to be a deceased dog. She described it as having a "pumpkin-shaped head", and large glowing orange eyes. 

Many alleged sightings occurred that year, most notably was local fire department chief and member of the city council, Richard Allan Murray, who reported driving along a creek bed when he saw a massive upright creature in his vehicle's headlights. As a result of these reported encounters, a 20 person posse was formed to hunt the creature but nothing was ever found. 

In 2019, a docudrama horror film entitled Momo: The Missouri Monster, was released and features a dramatization of the events of 1972. The film's cast includes Cliff Barackman and James "Bobo" Fay, best known for their appearances as Bigfoot Field Researchers Organization (BFRO) members on the Animal Planet series, Finding Bigfoot.

American theme park Six Flags St. Louis had a ride that operated from 1973 until 1994 named after the creature.

See also
Bigfoot
Skunk ape
Fouke Monster
Honey Island Swamp monster

References

Bibliography

 

Missouri folklore
American folklore
Bigfoot
American legendary creatures
Hominid cryptids